Transifex (previously known as Indifex) is a globalization management system (GMS), which is a proprietary, web-based translation platform. It targets technical projects with frequently updated content, such as softwares, documentations, and websites, and encourages the automation of the localization workflow by integrating with common developer tools.

Transifex is provided as software as a service (SaaS). It features paid plans, as well as a gratis (free of charge) plan for localizing open source software. Transifex itself was originally an open-source project, but the development of an open-source version of the software was discontinued in 2013. Hence, any further improvement of Transifex is only available to users of the proprietary Transifex SaaS.

The site provides a hosting platform for translation files and social networking functions such as feeds, discussion boards, translation suggestions and voting to allow translators to work collaboratively. Transifex is written using Django and Python by founder Dimitris Glezos under a Google Summer of Code project.

History 
Transifex, which started as a Google Summer of Code project to solve a Fedora Project problem has evolved into a complete movement backed by a new startup business, Transifex. The creator of Transifex, Dimitris Glezos, has worked since 2007 to create the Transifex vision of localization and i18n tools.  As of March 2014, transifex.com has over 17,000 project translations hosted across 150 languages, including Creative Commons, Coursera, Django and Django-cms, Dolibarr, Eventbrite, Fedora, Mercurial, Bitbucket, GlobaLeaks, TalentLMS, MeeGo, OpenStack, Pinterest, qBittorrent, reddit, Xfce, Wheelmap.org, VLC and others.

The company was formerly located in Greece but is now headquartered in Silicon Valley.

Workflow description
A project owner creates a project in Transifex. The person then creates a translation team or appoints maintainers to create the teams instead of them. The project owner or maintainer then uploads the translatable content to Transifex. Then, the translation teams begin the translation process. Once the content is translated, the project owner can download it manually or pull it using the Transifex command-line tool.

Supported document formats 
Transitex supports Android, Apple Resources, ASP, .desktop files, Gettext (PO/POT) files, Microsoft.NET, code files (C, Java, PHP, Qt), Joomla INI files, Mozilla DTD, Plain text, Subtitles, Web pages, XLIFF files, XML files, YAML, and more.

Notable features 
 Many supported file formats.
 Ability to download content, translate it offline and then upload it.
 An Online Editor called Live for translating resources online.
 Command Line Client that allows uploading, downloading and updating translation resources.
 Translation Memory that reduces the effort when having to translate something already translated somewhere else.
 Tools for monitoring activity and getting real time overviews of the status of a project.
 Messaging and notification system for keeping a translation team informed.
 API for integration with other platforms/services.
 Ability to re-use the same translation teams when managing multiple projects and manage them from one master project.
 Term glossary that works with an upvote/downvote fashion.
Framework specific SDKs that follow a universal localization syntax (Android, iOS, Javascript/ React, Django, Python)

See also 
 Pootle
 translatewiki.net
 Weblate

References

External links 
 

Software-localization tools